Naomi Levari (in Hebrew: נעמי לבארי; born October 10, 1978) is an Israeli-German film producer and story editor.

Early life and education 
Levari was born in the United States, and at the age of 5 moved to Jerusalem with her family. She studied film in high school. In 1996, she refused to enlist for her compulsory military service as a conscientious objector.

In 2004, she graduated from the Sam Spiegel School of Film and Television, with highest honors. During her studies, she co-produced Oneg Shabat, a short film that went on to win multiple awards, and produced the documentary film Blue White Collar Criminal, the first student film to be released commercially in the school's history. Her graduation film, Draft, was screened at more than forty international film festivals, and won four awards and two special mentions.<ref>{{Cite news|url=http://www.habama.co.il/Pages/Description.aspx?ArticleId=843&Subj=1&Area=1|title=מחוות לסם שפיגל בפסטיבלי סרטים בצכיה ובאוסטרליה|date=July 21, 2007|work=הבמה|access-date=March 21, 2019|language=he}}</ref> The film was sold to broadcast companies around the world, has been included in school curricula, and was selected as one of the best films to come out of 'Sam Spiegel' by an international jury. Levari won multiple awards and scholarships, and grants from the Television Authority and the Yehoshua Rabinowitz Foundation.

Early career
Levari began working in the Israeli film industry, and in 2010 she founded Black Sheep Productions with her partner Saar Yogev. Levari and Yogev are married, and have two sons.

In 2013, Levari ran for parliament on the Da'am party list, headed by Asma Agbarieh Zahalka, but the party did not get the required number of votes to enter parliament.

In 2014, during Israel's attack on Gaza, Levari sent a video to the residents of Gaza, "A Message to Gaza", which became popular on social media, and was covered by the international press. Levari, however, refused to be interviewed on the subject, except for two underground blogs in Turkey and Iran.

 Career 
Levari started her professional life working in various set jobs, as an assistant director and assistant cinematographer, and then turned to directing music videos and multimedia performances, and worked as a content editor on prime time television shows.

In 2005, she began her collaboration with Saar Yogev during the Jerusalem Film Festival, and in 2008 the two began producing together. In 2010, they founded Black Sheep Productions, which has garnered a reputation in Israel and abroad as a selective, accessible and quality production company.

In addition to her production work, Levari coaches filmmakers on pitching, and teaches film in various institutions, both in Israel and around the world. She also serves in various public roles related to the Israeli film industry.

After the success of her student film, Draft'', Levari was invited to conduct a master class at Aarhus University in Denmark. in 2011, she was selected to participate in the Rotterdam International Film Festival's Rotterdam Lab, a workshop for the most promising emerging producers. In 2013, Levari was invited by the French foundation CNC to represent them in the producers' track at the Cannes Film Festival. That same year, she was a jury member for the documentary film competition at the Jerusalem Film Festival. In 2014 she was a member of the executive board of the Israeli Academy of Film and Television. In 2014 and 2015, she was a lector for the Israel Film Fund and for the International Film Lab in Jerusalem. In 2015 she was also on the jury for the Utopia Film Festival. In 2016, at the Cannes Film Festival, she was selected as a Notable Producer at the Holland Film Meetings, where she and director Yaron Shani presented one of Black Sheep's flagship projects, Love Trilogy.

Levari has worked as a guest lecturer and advisor at Beit Berl College, Sapir Academic College, Columbia University, and the Sam Spiegel Film School, her alma mater. In 2017, Black Sheep Productions was spotlighted, along with four other production companies, by Berlinale co-production market at the Berlin International Film Festival.

In 2018, Levari was one of the founders of the German production company Electric Sheep GmbH, with Saar Yogev and Michael Reuter. This same year, she was asked to join the EWA program, in which she mentors women film producers from around the world, and supports the professional reader team at the Berlin International Film Festival.. In 2019 Naomi joined First Cut Lab as an Editorial consultant and Berlinale Talents as mentor in its Script Station development program. In 2022 she served as a mentor for Netflix Turkey Series Lab.

Levari is dedicated to improving the status and representation of women in the Israeli film industry.

Filmography

References

External links 

 
 
 Black Sheep Productions, official website
 An Interview with Naomi Levari about "Draft"
 On Naomi Levari's "Draft"
 A partial eclipse of the son: An analysis of Naomi Levari's short film "Draft"
 "Draft" by Naomi Levari at Short Film Studies

Israeli women film directors
Israeli film producers
Israeli female screenwriters
Israeli women film producers
1978 births
Living people